The 1983-84 Four Hills Tournament took place at the four traditional venues of Oberstdorf, Garmisch-Partenkirchen, Innsbruck and Bischofshofen, located in Germany and Austria, between 30 December 1983 and 6 January 1984.

Results

Overall

References

External links 
  

Four Hills Tournament
1983 in ski jumping
1984 in ski jumping
1983 in German sport
1984 in German sport
1984 in Austrian sport